Pterostylis ciliata, commonly known as the hairy rufous greenhood, tall rusthood or hairy rustyhood is a plant in the orchid family Orchidaceae and is endemic to the south-west of Western Australia. It has a relatively large rosette of leaves at its base and up to eight or more green and brown flowers which lean forward and have a small, fleshy, insect-like labellum covered with hairs.

Description
Pterostylis ciliata, is a terrestrial,  perennial, deciduous, herb with an underground tuber. Flowering plants have a rosette at the base of the flowering spike but the leaves are usually withered by flowering time. The flowers lean forward and there are a small number of stem leaves wrapped around the flowering spike. Flowering occurs from September to November.

Taxonomy and naming
Pterostylis ciliata was first formally described in 1989 by Mark Clements and David Jones from a specimen collected near the Brookton Highway and the description was published in Australian Orchid Research. The specific epithet (ciliata) is derived from the Latin word cilium meaning "eyelash" referring to the hairs on the labellum.

Distribution and habitat
The hairy rufous greenhood grows in woodland and shrubland and is common in wandoo woodland. It occurs between Beverley and Esperance, sometimes as far north as Kalgoorlie, in the Avon Wheatbelt, Esperance Plains, Jarrah Forest, Mallee and Murchison biogeographic regions.

Conservation
Pterostylis ciliata is classified as "not threatened" by the Western Australian Government Department of Parks and Wildlife.

References

ciliata
Endemic orchids of Australia
Orchids of Western Australia
Plants described in 1989